Nannoarctia is a genus of moths in the family Erebidae. The genus was erected by Nobutoyo Kôda in 1988.

Species
Nannoarctia conjuncta (Hampson, 1901)
Nannoarctia conjuncta javanica Dubatolov, Haynes & Kishida, 2010
Nannoarctia conjuncta sumbana Dubatolov, Haynes & Kishida, 2010
Nannoarctia conjuncta williami (Rothschild, 1910)
Nannoarctia himalayana Dubatolov, Haynes & Kishida, 2010
Nannoarctia himalayana nepalica Dubatolov, Haynes & Kishida, 2010
Nannoarctia integra (Walker, 1855)
Nannoarctia obliquifascia (Hampson, 1894)
Nannoarctia takanoi (Sonan, 1934)
Nannoarctia tripartita (Walker, 1855)

Subgenus Pseudorajendra Dubatolov, Haynes & Kishida, 2007 
Nannoarctia dentata (Walker, 1855)

References
Dubatolov, V. V., Haynes, P. & Kishida, Y. (2007). "Review of the genus Rajendra Moore, with systematic notes on the genus Nannoarctia Kôda (Lepidoptera, Arctiidae)". Tinea. 20 (1): 67–76, Tokyo.
 

Spilosomina
Moth genera